The 1967 Cincinnati Reds season consisted of the Reds finishing in fourth place in the National League with a record of 87–75, 14½ games behind the NL and World Series Champion St. Louis Cardinals. The Reds were managed by Dave Bristol and played their home games at Crosley Field. This was the first season that the Reds wore their now famous Big Red Machine era uniforms. The uniforms themselves would see minor tweaks throughout the years. In 1972, the uniforms became pullovers and no longer had buttons. This variant would stay for the rest of its tenure until the uniform was retired all together following the 1992 season after 26 years.

Regular season 
On August 28, Johnny Bench made his major league debut at age 19.

Season standings

Record vs. opponents

Notable transactions 
 June 6, 1967: Chris Chambliss was drafted by the Reds in the 31st round of the 1967 Major League Baseball draft, but did not sign.

Roster

Player stats

Batting

Starters by position 
Note: Pos = Position; G = Games played; AB = At bats; H = Hits; Avg. = Batting average; HR = Home runs; RBI = Runs batted in

Other batters 
Note: G = Games played; AB = At bats; H = Hits; Avg. = Batting average; HR = Home runs; RBI = Runs batted in

Pitching

Starting pitchers 
Note: G = Games pitched; IP = Innings pitched; W = Wins; L = Losses; ERA = Earned run average; SO = Strikeouts

Other pitchers 
Note: G = Games pitched; IP = Innings pitched; W = Wins; L = Losses; ERA = Earned run average; SO = Strikeouts

Relief pitchers 
Note: G = Games pitched; W = Wins; L = Losses; SV = Saves; ERA = Earned run average; SO = Strikeouts

Farm system

Notes

References 
1967 Cincinnati Reds season at Baseball Reference

Cincinnati Reds seasons
Cincinnati Reds season
Cincinnati Reds